Running Wild is a 1927 American silent comedy film built around the unique talents of its star, W. C. Fields. The movie was filmed at Paramount Studios - 5555 Melrose Avenue, Hollywood, Los Angeles, California, USA.

Plot

Cast
W. C. Fields as Elmer Finch
Mary Brian as Elizabeth
Marie Shotwell as Mrs. Finch
Claude Buchanan as Dave Harvey
Frederick Burton as Mr. Harvey
Barnett Raskin as Junior
Frank Evans as Amos Barker
Edward Roseman as Arvo, the Hypnotist

Preservation status
The film was directed by Gregory La Cava and is preserved at the Library of Congress. It also received, along with several other Paramount titles, wide distribution on VHS tape in 1987 in celebration of Paramount's 75th anniversary. A restored version of the film was released on Blu-ray by Kino in 2018.

References

External links

Running Wild ; allmovie/ synopsis

1927 films
American silent feature films
Films directed by Gregory La Cava
1927 comedy films
Silent American comedy films
American black-and-white films
Surviving American silent films
1920s American films